is a city tram station on the Takaoka Kidō Line located in Takaoka, Toyama Prefecture, Japan. The present name is from March 29, 2014.

Surrounding area
Takaoka City Emergency Medical Center
Located in the former site of Honmaru Kaikan Hall

References

Railway stations in Toyama Prefecture